Kuklinskaya is a rural locality (a village) in Beketovskoye Rural Settlement, Vozhegodsky District, Vologda Oblast, Russia. The population was 15 as of 2002.

Geography 
Kuklinskaya is located 48 km northwest of Vozhega (the district's administrative centre) by road. Osiyevskaya is the nearest rural locality.

References 

Rural localities in Vozhegodsky District